Patnongon, officially the Municipality of Patnongon, is a 3rd class municipality in the province of Antique, Philippines. According to the 2020 census, it has a population of 38,329 people.

Geography

According to the Philippine Statistics Authority, the municipality has a land area of  constituting  of the  total area of Antique.

Climate

Barangays
Patnongon is politically subdivided into 36 barangays.

Demographics

In the 2020 census, Patnongon had a population of 38,329.

Patnonganons speak Kinaray-a as their main language while Hiligaynon is used as their secondary language.

Economy

Tourism

 La Parola Orchids Beach Resort in Barangay Amparo
 Igbarawan Garden Resort in Igbarawan
 Bato-Bugtong Beach and resort in Igbarawan 
 D'Viking Beach Resort  in Igbarawan 
 Apgahan Beach Resort / San Ramon Beach Resort
 Bato Tibi of Tamayoc
 Villa Alma Beach Resort in Padang
 Mountain Climbing in small mountains near Padang, Apgahan, Aureliana, La-Rioja and Aureliana where one can find fruitbearing wild trees
 Old Municipal Building Constructed by Spaniards
 Old Spanish Church Convent now Saint Augustine's Academy of Patnongon, Inc. old building (It is believed that if it was not bombed by the Americans during World War II, the Patnongon Church would have been the biggest in Antique Province and one of the oldest churches in the Philippines.)
 Spelunking in Kuweba Dapa and Kuweba Turu-ong in Barangay San Rafael
 Shrine of Rosa Mystica in Tigmanali
 Linaw-Balud Falls in Barangay Igburi
 Lipunto Range in Barangay Patlabawon
 Ulo Kuliatan and Busay Luhot in Aureliana, Patnongon, Antique
 Guinobatan Mountain at the boundary of Belison and Aureliana
 Madlakat Cliff in the Boundary of San Remegio, Sibalom, Patlabawon and Aureliana

References

External links

 [ Philippine Standard Geographic Code]

Municipalities of Antique (province)